Caltex House may refer to the following buildings that were named Caltex House when built:

Chevron House, in Singapore
Stamford on Kent, in Sydney, Australia